Asia Muhammad and Jessica Pegula defeated Sara Errani and Jasmine Paolini in the final, 6–3, 6–1, to win the women's doubles tennis title at the 2022 Melbourne Summer Set 1. This was the first edition of the tournament.

Seeds

Draw

Draw

See also
 2022 Melbourne Summer Set 2 – Doubles

References

External links
Main draw

Melbourne Summer Set 1 - Doubles